George Sargent may refer to:

George Sargent (businessman) (1859–1921), Australian
George Sargent (golfer) (1882–1962), English